is a Japanese competitor and a performer in yo-yo. He won the World Yo-Yo Contest 8 times in 2A and 4 times in CB. He has the most world titles of any yo-yoer in the history of yo-yo competition.

Biography
He started practicing yo-yo in March 1998.　As soon after starting yo-yo, he joined THP Japan Pro Spinners, Japanese branch of Team High Performance.

On April 5, 1998, he was certified as "Pro Spinner" who passed Hyper-level skills set by BANDAI at Toyland Fukushima.

In 2005, he scored 100 points which is a perfect score in 2A. It was the first time in the history of the World Contest for someone to earn a perfect score.

In March 2008, he graduated Fukushimakita High School.

In April 2008, he was matriculated in Faculty of Business Administration of Asia University.

Results

Other results
4th Hyper Yo-Yo Japan Championships Preliminary Tohoku, Championship Division winner (1998 / BANDAI)
5th Hyper Yo-Yo Japan Championships Preliminary Hokkaido, Free Style Division 3rd place (August 15, 1999 / BANDAI)
5th Hyper Yo-Yo Japan Championships Final, Free Style Division 3rd place (1999 / BANDAI)
6th Hyper Yo-Yo Japan Championships Preliminary　Hokkaido, Free Style Division champion (August 13, 2000 / BANDAI)
Hyper Yo-Yo Japan Championships Final, Free Style Division 4th place (September 24, 2000 / BANDAI)
JYYA Yo-Yo Contest 2001, Yo-Yo Free Style Division AA champion (November 5, 2001 / JYYA)

References

1989 births
Sportspeople from Fukushima Prefecture
Yo-yo performers
Living people